OGLE-TR-113 is a dim, distant magnitude 16 binary star in the star fields of the constellation Carina. Because of its distance of about 1170 light years, and location in a crowded field it was not notable in any way. Its apparent brightness changes when one of its planets transits, so the star has been given the variable star designation V752 Carinae.   Spectral type of the star is type K dwarf star, slightly cooler and less luminous than the Sun.

Planetary system
However, in 2002 the Optical Gravitational Lensing Experiment (OGLE) detected periodic dimming in the star's light curve indicating a transiting, planetary-sized object.
Since low-mass red dwarfs and brown dwarfs may mimic a planet radial velocity measurements were necessary to calculate the mass of the body. In 2004 the object was proved to be a new transiting extrasolar planet, OGLE-TR-113b.

See also 
 OGLE-TR-132
 Optical Gravitational Lensing Experiment
 List of extrasolar planets

References

External links 

K-type main-sequence stars
Planetary transit variables
Carina (constellation)
Planetary systems with one confirmed planet
Carinae, V752